Mariana Mantovana is a comune (municipality) in the Province of Mantua in the Italian region Lombardy, located about  southeast of Milan and about  west of Mantua.

Mariana Mantovana borders the following municipalities: Acquanegra sul Chiese, Asola, Piubega, and Redondesco.

References

Cities and towns in Lombardy